The 2013 Gold Coast Titans season was the 7th in the club's history. Coached by John Cartwright and co-captained by Greg Bird and Nate Myles, they competed in the NRL's 2013 Telstra Premiership. Gold Coast finished the regular season in 9th (out of 16) and failed to qualify the finals for the third consecutive year.

Season summary

Milestones
Round 1: Albert Kelly, Brad Takairangi and Dave Taylor made their debuts for the club.
Round 2: Greg Bird scored his 50th career try.
Round 2: The club recorded their biggest ever win, 36 points.
Round 3: Ryan James scored his 1st career try.
Round 3: Ashley Harrison played his 250th career game.
Round 4: Steve Michaels played his 50th game for the club.
Round 6: Anthony Don and Sam Irwin made their first grade debuts.
Round 8: Mark Ioane made his first grade debut.
Round 10: William Zillman played his 100th game for the club.
Round 11: The club recorded their biggest ever win, 38 points.
Round 11: The club scored 40+ points for the first time in their history, with 42.
Round 12: Jamal Idris played his 100th career game.
Round 12: Shane Gray made his first grade debut.
Round 16: Ashley Harrison played his 100th game for the club.
Round 17: Jahrome Hughes and Hymel Hunt made their first grade debuts.
Round 17: Greg Bird played his 200th career game and Matt Srama played his 50th career game.
Round 21: Jamie Dowling scored his first career try.
Round 22: Luke O'Dwyer played his 100th game for the club.
Round 22: David Mead scored his 50th career try.
Round 23: Kevin Gordon scored his 50th career try.
Round 24: Mark Minichiello played his 150th game for the club.
Round 25: Luke Bailey played his 250th career game.
Round 26: Beau Falloon played his 50th career game.

Squad List

Squad Movement

Gains

Losses

Re-signings

Contract Lengths

Ladder

Fixtures

Pre-season

Regular season

Statistics

Source:

Representative honours
The following players have played a representative match in 2013.

References

Gold Coast Titans seasons
Gold Coast Titans season